Abu Muhammad Yahya ibn Yahya ibn Kathir ibn Wislasen ibn Shammal ibn Mangaya al-Laythi (died 848), better known as Yahya ibn Yahya, was a prominent Andalusian Muslim scholar. He was responsible for spreading the Maliki school of jurisprudence in Al-Andalus. Furthermore, he is considered the most important transmitter of Malik ibn Anas' Muwatta.

Biography 
Yahya was born in the area of Algeciras to the Banu Abi Isa family. His grandfather, Abu Isa Kathir, the eponymous of the family, was a Masmuda Berber soldier and a mawla of the Banu Layth of Kinana, thus the nisba al-Laythi. Abd al-Rahman I rewarded Kathir by giving him the governorship of Algeciras, then Sidonia and later again Algeciras, where he died and was buried.

Yahya ibn Yahya travelled to the East at a young age and studied with Malik ibn Anas, becoming an ardent follower of his. Al-Andalus in his time was dominated by the followers of imam al-Awza'i – due to the fact that most Arabic Muslim conquerors came from Syria – beside different other schools of Jurisprudence according to imam al-Dhahabi in his tarikh al-Islam al-Kabir when mentioning Yayha's teacher Shabtun (Zaid ibn Abdarrahman al-Lakhmi). Returning to Al-Andalus, he focused on his scholarly work. As a member of the shura (the advisory board that the emir and judges had to consult), he had an enormous influence on the nomination of legal positions. Still, he himself never accepted a legal position. In his role as member of the shura he became close to the ruler of Al-Andalus, who was apparently impressed with his intelligence and authority on Islamic matters. He thus grew to become the most influential member of the shura, giving him the opportunity to nominate judges who also favored the Maliki school. At the end of his life, the Maliki school was the most important in Al-Andalus.

At one point he was accused of taking part in a rising, after which he fled Cordoba to live amongst the Masmuda tribes near Toledo. He was pardoned by emir Al-Hakam I and allowed to return.

His descendants became one of the greatest families of the 9th and 10th centuries, due in part to the fame of their ancestor. But among them personalities with their own light also appear, who maintain the power and influence of the family due to their individual merits.

References

Sources

 

848 deaths
9th-century Berber people
Berber scholars
Maliki scholars from al-Andalus
Masmuda
9th-century people from al-Andalus
Year of birth unknown